The Dutch Eerste Divisie in the 1992–93 season was contested by 18 teams, two less than in the previous season. This was due to the departure of VCV Zeeland and FC Wageningen. VVV-Venlo won the championship.

The play-off system was changed again this season, it was made less complex. A second team from the Eredivisie now was offered a chance to avert relegation. Only a group round was held in which six entrants were divided in two groups of three teams. Four entrants were from this league, the two others were the numbers 16 and 17 from the Eredivisie.

New entrants
Relegated from the 1991–92 Eredivisie
 ADO Den Haag (named FC Den Haag last season)
 De Graafschap
 VVV-Venlo

League standings

Promotion/relegation play-offs
There was only one round in the promotion/relegation play-offs this year. Six entrants (four from this league, two from the Eredivisie) entered in two groups. The two group winners were promoted to (or remained in) the Eredivisie.

See also
 1992–93 Eredivisie
 1992–93 KNVB Cup

References
Netherlands - List of final tables (RSSSF)

Eerste Divisie seasons
2
Neth